Osler is a town in the Canadian province of Saskatchewan, founded in the 1890s. The community was named after Sir Edmund Boyd Osler (1845–1924), who was an Ontario-based explorer, railroad financier, and Member of Parliament.

The town has a library, seniors' centre, volunteer fire department, gas station, grocery store and first responders, leisure centre, two schools, and four churches. Osler is about 20 km north of Saskatoon.

History

Osler was built along the historic Qu'Appelle, Long Lake and Saskatchewan Railroad after surveying starting in 1890 by the engineering firm of Osler, Hammond and Nanton.

In 1892 the station house was built. The town of Osler came into existence soon after and became one of many towns and villages to spring up along the new railroad. Osler officially became a village on April 9, 1904, and stayed a village until May 1, 1918, when it became a Hamlet. Then, in 1949 it was upgraded to organized Hamlet status. Osler became a village for a second time in 1968, and was officially designated Town of Osler in 1985.

By the 1970s the railroad station had fallen into disuse and it was demolished by Canadian National Railway in 1973.

Demographics 

See also
 List of communities in Saskatchewan
 List of towns in Saskatchewan

References

External links

Towns in Saskatchewan
Division No. 11, Saskatchewan